Majorda Junction railway station (Station code: MJO) a small Junction station in South Goa district, Goa. It is located near Majorda village. The station consists of two platforms.

References

Railway stations in South Goa district
Karwar railway division
Railway stations along Konkan Railway line
Railway stations opened in 1997
Railway junction stations in Goa